Heritage Models was an American game company that produced role-playing games and game supplements.

History
Wargame company Battleline Publications merged into Heritage USA to speed its growth. Heritage sold off the Battleline operation to Avalon Hill in October 1979. The company also formed the Dwarfstar Games line in the early 1980s.

Publications
Der Kriegspielers Fantastiques, a line of 25mm fantasy wargame figures.
Star Trek: Adventure Gaming in the Final Frontier was published in 1978.
John Carter, Warlord of Mars was published by Heritage Models, Inc. in 1978.
Circus Maximus, a combination of a racetrack-based game called Chariot Racing and a one-on-one combat game called Gladiator, was published in 1979. When Battlefield was sold to Avalon Hill later in 1979, the new owners published the two components of Circus Maximus as two separate games the following year. While Gladiator retained its original title, Chariot Racing was renamed Circus Maximus.
The Knights and Magick Rules Set was published by Heritage USA in 1980.
Star Commandos (board game, 1980)
Swordbearer was first published in 1982 by Heritage USA. Fantasy Games Unlimited purchased the rights to Swordbearer, and also bought Heritage's old stock, something that FGU's Scott Bizar felt was a necessary part of such a deal.

Dwarfstar Games

Gametime Games
Quest (board game, 1978)
Spellmaker (board game, 1978)
''Strange New Worlds (board game, 1978)

References

Role-playing game publishing companies